The 2015 Canadian Mixed Curling Championship were held from November 10 to 15, 2014 at the North Bay Granite Club in North Bay, Ontario. The winners of this championship represented Canada at the inaugural World Mixed Curling Championship in 2015.

Teams
The teams are listed as follows:

Round robin

Standings
Final Standings

Results
The draw is listed as follows:

Draw 1
Monday, November 10, 9:30 am

Draw 2
Monday, November 10, 3:00 pm

Draw 3
Monday, November 10, 7:30 pm

Draw 4
Tuesday, November 11, 9:30 am

Draw 5
Tuesday, November 11, 2:00 pm

Draw 6
Tuesday, November 11, 6:30 pm

Draw 7
Wednesday, November 12, 9:30 am

Draw 8
Wednesday, November 12, 2:00 pm

Draw 9
Wednesday, November 12, 6:30 pm

Placement Round

Standings
Final Standings

Results

Draw 10
Thursday, November 13, 9:30 am

Draw 11
Thursday, November 13, 2:00 pm

Draw 12
Thursday, November 13, 6:30 pm

Draw 13
Friday, November 14, 9:30 am

Draw 14
Friday, November 14, 2:00 pm

Draw 15
Friday, November 14, 6:30 pm

Playoffs

Semifinals
Saturday, November 15, 9:30 am

Bronze medal game
Saturday, November 15, 2:00 pm

Final
Saturday, November 15, 2:00 pm

References

External links

Mixed Curling Championship
Canadian Mixed Curling Championship
Sport in North Bay, Ontario
Curling in Northern Ontario
Canadian Mixed Curling Championship
Canadian Mixed Curling Championship